Oleg Aleksandrovich Shatskikh (born 15 October 1974), is an Uzbek former professional footballer who played as a forward in the Uzbek League. His brother Maksim Shatskikh is also a former footballer.

International carer
Shatskikh made his debut in the Uzbekistan national team on 11 September 1996 and played 11 matches, scoring 9 goals.

Honours
Pakhtakor Tashkent
 Uzbek League: 1992

Navbahor Namangan
 Uzbek League: 1996
 Uzbek Cup: 1995

Individual
 Uzbek League Top Scorer: 1995 (26 goals), 1996 (23)
 Uzbekistan Player of the Year: 1995
 Asian Player of the Month: September 1997

References

External links

Oleg Shatskikh player info at FIFA.com

1974 births
Living people
Uzbekistani people of Russian descent
Sportspeople from Tashkent
Uzbekistani footballers
Association football forwards
Uzbekistan international footballers
Soviet Union youth international footballers
Pakhtakor Tashkent FK players
FC Dustlik players
Navbahor Namangan players
FK Dinamo Samarqand players